Carnesecca Arena (formerly Alumni Hall) is a 6,107-seat multi-purpose arena in the borough of Queens in New York City, New York. It was built in 1961 and renamed in honor of Hall of Fame Coach Lou Carnesecca on November 23, 2004. It is the exclusive home to the St. John's University Red Storm women's basketball team, and also, along with Madison Square Garden, hosts home Red Storm men's basketball games.  The building hosted first-round games of the NCAA men's basketball tournament from 1970 to 1974.  Up until March 2014, it was the most recent New York City venue to host the tournament.

Gallery

See also
 List of NCAA Division I basketball arenas

References

External links
 Carnesecca Arena at RedStormSports.com

College basketball venues in the United States
1961 establishments in New York City
St. John's Red Storm basketball venues
Basketball venues in New York City
Sports venues in Queens, New York
Sports venues completed in 1961
College volleyball venues in the United States
Volleyball venues in New York City